Northwest Allen County Schools is a public school district that serves Lake, Eel River, and Perry Townships in Allen County, Indiana. It is commonly referred to as NACS because of its respective initials.

History
The school district was organized in 1965 by the virtue of the consolidation of Eel River-Perry Consolidated School and Lake Township School. The first school was Carroll High School built in 1967.

Governing
The schools are governed by a five-member non-partisan school board. Since the 1965 official organization of the district, there have only been a total of 27 board members serve a position. Members are elected at the time of the May primary in alternate years with one representative from each of the townships and two at-large representatives. The Board employs a superintendent of schools as its chief executive officer to administer its operational policies.

Area Served
The district includes all of Arcola and Huntertown as well as the northernmost parts of Fort Wayne, Indiana. It also includes rural Allen County residents who live near Churubusco.

This system consists of the schools:
Arcola Elementary
Cedar Canyon Elementary
Hickory Center Elementary
Huntertown Elementary
Oak View Elementary
Perry Hill Elementary
Eel River Elementary
Carroll Middle
Maple Creek Middle
Carroll High School (10-12) and Freshman Campus (9)

References

External links
Official website

School districts in Indiana
School districts established in 1965
Education in Allen County, Indiana
1965 establishments in Indiana